Sessue Hayakawa (June 10, 1886 – November 23, 1973) was one of the first Asian actors and filmmakers to gain great fame and success in the United States.  He starred in both English-language and Japanese-language films.  His career peaked during the silent film period but continued on and eventually thrived in the talkie era, culminating with an Academy Award-nominated performance in The Bridge on the River Kwai in 1957.

Producer

Director

Writer

Appearances as himself
 United States Fourth Liberty Loan Drive (1918)
 Night Life in Hollywood (1922)
 Around the World in 80 Minutes with Douglas Fairbanks (1931)
 Running Hollywood (1932)

Television appearances
 Kraft Television Theatre (1958)
 Studio One (1958)
 Wagon Train (1958) as Sakae Ito
 The Steve Allen Show (1959)
 Here's Hollywood (1961, 1962)
 Route 66 (1963) as Takasuka
 Taikōki (1965) as Takeda Shingen

Early work
 O Mimi San (1914) as Yorotomo
 The Courtship of O San (1914) as Shotoku
 The Geisha (1914) as Takura
 The Ambassador's Envoy (1914) as Kamuri
 A Tragedy of the Orient (1914) as Kato
 A Relic of Old Japan (1914) as Koto
 The Curse of Caste (1914) as Kato
 The Village 'Neath the Sea (1914) as Red Elk
 Star of the North (1914)
 The Death Mask (1914) as Running Wolf
 The Hateful God (1914)
 Nipped (1914) as Taro Kamura
 The Vigil (1914) as Kenjiro
 Mother of the Shadows (1914) as Running Elk
 The Last of the Line (1914) as Tiah - Gray Otter's Son

Thomas Ince Films

Famous Player Lasky Films
 After Five (1915) as Oki - the Valet
 The Famine (1915) as Horisho
 The Chinatown Mystery (1915) as Yo Hong
 The Clue (1915) as Nogi
 The Secret Sin (1915) as Lin Foo
 The Cheat (1915) as Hishuru Tori (original release) / Haka Arakau
 Temptation (1915) as Opera Admirer
 Alien Souls (1916) as Sakata
 The Honorable Friend (1916) as Makino
 The Soul of Kura San (1916) as Toyo
 The Victoria Cross (1916) as Azimoolah
 Each to His Kind (1917) as Rhandah
 The Bottle Imp (1917) as Lopaka
 The Jaguar's Claws (1917) as El Jaguar
 Forbidden Paths (1917) as Sato
 Hashimura Togo (1917) as Hashimura Togo
 The Call of the East (1917) as Arai Takada
 The Secret Game (1917)
 The Hidden Pearls (1918) as Tom Garvin
 The Honor of His House (1918) as Count Ito Onato
 The White Man's Law (1918) as John A. Genghis
 The Bravest Way (1918) as Kara Tamura
 The City of Dim Faces (1918) as Jang Lung
 His Birthright (1918) as Yukio
 Banzai (1918) as The American General
 The Temple of Dusk (1918) as Akira

Haworth Pictures Corporation

 A Heart in Pawn (1919) as Tomaya
 The Courageous Coward (1919) as Suki Iota
 His Debt (1919) as Goto Mariyama
 The Man Beneath (1919) as Dr. Chindi Ashutor
 The Gray Horizon (1919) as Yamo Masata
 The Dragon Painter (1919) as Tatsu - the Dragon Painter
 Bonds of Honor (1919) as Yamashito / Sasamoto
 The Illustrious Prince (1919) as Prince Maiyo
 The Tong Man (1919) as Luk Chen
 The Beggar Prince (1920) as Nikki / Prince
 The Brand of Lopez (1920) as Vasco Lopez
 The Devil's Claim (1920) as Akbar Khan / Hassan
 Li Ting Lang (1920) as Li Ting Lang
 An Arabian Knight (1920) as Ahmed
 The First Born (1921) as Chan Wang
 Black Roses (1921) as Yoda
 Where Lights Are Low (1921) as Tsu Wong Shih
 The Swamp (1921) as Wang

European, American and Japanese Films
 Five Days to Live (1922) as Tai Leung
 The Vermilion Pencil (1922, USA) as Tse Chan / The Unknown / Li Chan
 La Bataille (1923) as Le Marquis Yorisaka
 The Great Prince Shan (1924) as Prince Shan
 The Danger Line (1924) as Marquis Yorisaka
 Sen Yan's Devotion (1924) as Sen Yan
 J'ai tué! (1924) as Hideo - l'antiquaire japonais
 The Man Who Laughed Last (1929) (early talking film for Sessue Hayakawa)
 Daughter of the Dragon (1931, USA (Paramount Pictures)) as Ah Kee
 Taiyo wa higashi yori (1932) as Kenji
 Bakugeki hikôtai (1934)
 Tojin Okichi (1935) as Townsend Harris
 Kuni o mamoru mono: Nichiren (1935) as Nichiren
 The Daughter of the Samurai (1937, German-Japanese) as Iwao Yamato
 Yoshiwara (1937, French) as Ysamo, Kuli
 The Cheat (1937) as Prince Hu-Long
 Storm Over Asia (1938, French) as Le prince Ling
 Patrouille blanche (1942) as Halloway
  (1942) as Ying Tchaï
 Malaria (1943) as Saïdi
 The Midnight Sun (1943) as Matsui
 Le Cabaret du grand large (1946) as Professeur Wang
 Quartier chinois (1947) as Tchang

Final Films
 Tokyo Joe (1949) as Baron Kimura
 Three Came Home (1950) as Col. Mitsuo Suga
 Harukanari haha no kuni (1950) as Joe Hayami
 Re mizeraburu: kami to akuma (1950) 
 Re mizeraburu: kami to jiyu no hata (1950)
 Onna kanja himon - Akô rôshi (1953) as Sakon Tachibana
 Kurama Tengu to Katsu Kaishû (1953) as Awanokami Katsu
 Nihon yaburezu (1954)
 House of Bamboo (1955) as Insp. Kita (dubbed by Richard Loo)
 The Bridge on the River Kwai (1957) (for which he was nominated for an Academy Award for Best Supporting Actor) as Colonel Saito
 The Geisha Boy (1958) as Mr. Sikita
 Green Mansions (1959) as Runi
 Hell to Eternity (1960) as Gen. Matsui
 Swiss Family Robinson (1960) as Kuala, Pirate Chief
 The Big Wave (1961) as The Old Man
 The Daydreamer (1966) as The Mole (voice)
 Junjô nijûsô (1967) as Tajima (final film role)

Bibliography

References

Director filmographies
Male actor filmographies
Japanese filmographies